Yevhen Vyacheslavovych Chahovets (born 24 March 1998) is a Ukrainian professional footballer who plays for Ordabasy.

References

External links
 
 
 

1998 births
Living people
Kharkiv State College of Physical Culture 1 alumni
Ukrainian footballers
Association football defenders
FC Shakhtar Donetsk players
FC Minsk players
FC Rukh Brest players
FC Ordabasy players
Belarusian Premier League players
Ukrainian expatriate footballers
Expatriate footballers in Belarus
Expatriate footballers in Kazakhstan
Ukrainian expatriate sportspeople in Belarus
Sportspeople from Kharkiv Oblast